Kabban Mirza (born 1937 or 1938) is known for singing a couple of melodious songs in Hindi cinema. Not much is known about Mirza's life and his whereabouts, though it is known that he belonged to Hapur, Uttar Pradesh. His singing was featured in the film Razia Sultan, directed by Kamal Amrohi (1983). Two of his songs are "Aayee Zanjeer Ki Jhankar" and "Tera Hijr Mera Naseeb Hai". He also sang a song, entitled "Is Pyar Ki Basti Mein" for the movie, Sheeba, though he was not given credit for it.
Kabban Mirza sang a number 'Aaj Unke Pay-E-Naaz Pein' the film Captain Azaad (1964). The song was written by Mohsin Nawab and composed by Peter Nawab, is a rousing qawwali in which Mirza feelingly serenades a woman.

Kabban Mirza used to work as a radio announcer with Vividh Bharti, All India Radio station, Mumbai. He used to do the popular Hindi old song programme at 10.00 pm, named Chaya Geet on Vivid Bharti. You can still remember his heavy & different voice saying - Chaya Geet sunanewalo ko Kabban Mirza ka adab " ! (Kamal Amrohi selected him over a lot of popular singers of that era. According to him, Kabban Mirza's voice suited the character portrayed by Dharmendra. We can see the quality of his voice as the music director for this film was the renowned music director Khayyam .

Mirza later suffered from Cancer of the larynx. His last years of life went unnoticed affected with cancer with his family in mainly Muslim dominated area , Mumbra , outskirt of Thane city near Mumbai.  The government paid for his treatment. He was entitled to a pension after long years of service. He had five children. His son M. Imtiyaz served as a broadcaster with Radio Asia. 
While no concrete information of his death exists in the internet, a website refers to him as the "Late Kabban Mirza".

References

1930s births
Indian Muslims
Year of death missing
Indian male singers
Indian male playback singers